Honda Sparta is a scooter that was built from the 1970s through the 1990s. It was manufactured by the Honda Corporation. There are multiple models in the Sparta series.

Sparta
Motor scooters
Motorcycles introduced in the 1970s